The Injury Severity Score (ISS) is an established medical score to assess trauma severity. It correlates with mortality, morbidity and hospitalization time after trauma. It is used to define the term major trauma. A major trauma (or polytrauma) is defined as the Injury Severity Score being greater than 15. The AIS Committee of the Association for the Advancement of Automotive Medicine (AAAM) designed and improves upon the scale.

Abbreviated Injury Scale (AIS)
The Abbreviated Injury Scale (AIS) is an anatomically based consensus-derived global severity scoring system that classifies each injury in every body region according to its relative severity on a six-point ordinal scale:
 Minor
 Moderate
 Serious
 Severe
 Critical
 Maximal (currently untreatable).

There are nine AIS chapters corresponding to nine body regions:
 Head
 Face
 Neck
 Thorax
 Abdomen
 Spine
 Upper Extremity
 Lower Extremity
 External and other.

Definition
The ISS is based (see below) upon the Abbreviated Injury Scale (AIS).
To calculate an ISS for an injured person, the body is divided into six ISS body regions. These body regions are:
 Head or neck – including cervical spine
 Face – including the facial skeleton, nose, mouth, eyes and ears
 Chest – thoracic spine and diaphragm
 Abdomen or pelvic contents – abdominal organs and lumbar spine
 Extremities or pelvic girdle – pelvic skeleton
 External

To calculate an ISS, take the highest AIS severity code in each of the three most severely injured ISS body regions, square each AIS code and add the three squared numbers for an ISS ( where A, B, C are the AIS scores of the three most injured ISS body regions).
The ISS scores ranges from 1 to 75 (i.e. AIS scores of 5 for each category). If any of the three scores is a 6, the score is automatically set at 75.  Since a score of 6 ("unsurvivable") indicates the futility of further medical care in preserving life, this may mean a cessation of further care in triage for a patient with a score of 6 in any category.

References

External links
Online Calculator of the Injury Severity Score

 

Diagnostic emergency medicine
Diagnostic intensive care medicine
Medical scales